The Gujarat Samachar is a Gujarati-language daily newspaper published in India. Its headquarters are in Ahmedabad with a branch in Surat. It is distributed from Ahmedabad, Vadodara, Surat, Rajkot, Bhavnagar, Mumbai, Mehsana, Bhuj and New York City.

The newspaper was founded by Chhabilbhai M. Patel in 1932. It is later acquired by Shantilal Shah in 1952. Its first issue was published on 16 January 1932.

History

Availability 
Gujarati Samachar is primarily available in the state of Gujarat in India. The newspaper is available in several cities in the state including Ahmedabad, Surat, Rajkot, Bhavnagar, and Baroda, Bhuj, Mehsana, Junagadh among others.

Television channel
It also launched a Gujarati News Channel in December 2012, GSTV.

Notable columnists 
Anil Chavda, poet, writer and columnist
Bakul Tripathi, humour essayist, writer and columnist
Hardwar Goswami, poet, writer and columnist
Jay Vasavada, writer and columnist
Joravarsinh Jadav, writer, folklorist and columnist
Kumarpal Desai, author, critic, editor, journalist and columnist
Makrand Mehta, writer, historian and columnist
Pravin Darji, writer and columnist
Rajesh Vyas, poet, writer and columnist
Vinodini Nilkanth, writer, columnist and novelist
Harshal Pushkarna, science writer

References

External links
Gujarat Samachar official Website 

Gujarati-language newspapers published in India
Gujarati-language television channels in India
Television stations in Ahmedabad
Mass media in Ahmedabad
Publications established in 1932
1932 establishments in India
Newspapers published in Gujarat